The Thomas P. Kennedy Jr. House is a historic mansion in Forest Hills, Tennessee, U.S.. It was built in 1937 for Thomas P. Kennedy Jr., the president of O'Bryan Brothers Inc. It was designed by Donald W. Southgate in the Colonial Revival architectural style. It has been listed on the National Register of Historic Places since October 27, 2003.

References

Houses on the National Register of Historic Places in Tennessee
Colonial Revival architecture in Tennessee
Houses completed in 1937
Buildings and structures in Davidson County, Tennessee